Zdenko Vukasović (19 September 1941 – 27 May 2021) was a Croatian professional footballer who played as a goalkeeper.

Career
Born in Split, Vukasović played for RNK Split, Hajduk Split, La Gantoise, Anderlecht, Cercle Brugge and Lokeren.

Vukasović played in 50 matches for Hajduk and, as it was not allowed to leave Yugoslavia before the age of 28, he was helped by a masseur to move abroad to Belgium, aged 24.

He played 28 matches for La Gantoise, where he succeeded club legend Mance Seghers but was relegated to the second tier. He then had two seasons at Belgian's second level and one back in the top tier with Cercle Brugge.

Death
Vukasović died on 27 May 2021, at the age of 79.

References

External links
 

1941 births
2021 deaths
Footballers from Split, Croatia
Association football goalkeepers
Yugoslav footballers
RNK Split players
HNK Hajduk Split players
K.A.A. Gent players
R.S.C. Anderlecht players
Cercle Brugge K.S.V. players
K.S.C. Lokeren Oost-Vlaanderen players
Yugoslav First League players
Belgian Pro League players
Challenger Pro League players
Yugoslav expatriate footballers
Expatriate footballers in Belgium
Yugoslav expatriate sportspeople in Belgium
Burials at Lovrinac Cemetery